Chinese Laundry is a historic building in San Diego, California, US.

Chinese Laundry may also refer to:
 Chinese laundry, services provided by Chinese immigrants in the US and Canada in the late 19th and early 20th centuries
 Chinese Laundry, a historic building in Bodie, California, US
 Chinese Laundry, a building demolished in the 1911 Torreón massacre
 "Chinese Laundry", a diorama created by Frank Wong

See also

 Chinese Hand Laundry Alliance, a North American labour union
 "Chinese Laundry Blues", a 1932 Jack Cottrell song
 In a Chinese Laundry , an 1897 comedy film